The 1939–40 Segunda División season, the first after a three-year hiatus caused by the Spanish Civil War, saw 40 teams participate in the second flight Spanish league. Murcia was promoted to Primera División. RD Oriamendi, Sestao, Alavés, Erandio, Granollers, Ferroviaria, Imperio de Madrid, Mallorca, Constancia, Elche, Alicante, Burjassot, Imperial de Murcia, Ceuta SC, Onuba and Tánger were relegated to Tercera División due to a Federation decision.

Group I

Teams

League table

Results

Group II

Teams

League table

Results

Group III

Teams

League table

Results

Group IV

Teams

League table

Results

Group V

Teams

League table

Results

First promotion playoff

Results

Second promotion playoff

External links
LFP website

Segunda División seasons
2
Spain